{{DISPLAYTITLE:C16H22O4}}
The molecular formula C16H22O4 may refer to:

 Dibutyl phthalate, an organic compound commonly used plasticizer
 Diisobutyl phthalate, an odorless plasticizer

Molecular formulas